Shri Bhadriya Lathi railway station is a railway station in Jaisalmer district, Rajasthan. Its code is SBLT. It serves Shri Bhadriya Lathi station. The station consists of a single platform. Passenger, Express, and Superfast trains halt here.

References

Railway stations in Jaisalmer district
Jodhpur railway division